Louise Falls is a waterfall on the Hay River in the Northwest Territories, Canada, located just downstream of higher Alexandra Falls. Both waterfalls are part of Twin Falls Gorge Territorial Park.

See also
List of waterfalls by flow rate

References

Waterfalls of Canada